This pages summarizes the results of the 2012–13 season of Gabon Championnat National D1, the top football league in Gabon.

Racing Club de Masuku was renamed to AC Bongoville, and was relocated from Libreville to Bongoville.

League table
<onlyinclude>

External links
RSSSF info

Gabon Championnat National D1 seasons
Gabon
football
football